Chikhalia is a surname. Notable people with the surname include:

Bhavna Chikhalia (1955–2013), Indian politician
Deepika Chikhalia (born 1965), Indian actress

See also
Chikhali (disambiguation)

Indian surnames